Pseudoseioptera is a genus of picture-winged flies in the family Ulidiidae.

Species
 P. albipes
 P. dubiosa
 P. ingrica

References

Ulidiidae
Taxa named by Aleksandr Stackelberg